Susan Clair Lee (born May 14, 1954) is an American politician. She has served as the 72nd Maryland Secretary of State since 2023. She was previously a member of the Maryland State Senate from 2015 to 2023, and of the Maryland House of Delegates from 2002 to 2015. She represented District 16, which is located in Montgomery County, and was the first Asian American elected to the Maryland State Senate and the first Asian American woman and first Chinese American to be elected to the Maryland legislature.

Early life and education 
Lee was born in San Antonio, Texas. She grew up in Montgomery County and attended Winston Churchill High School. She earned a Bachelor of Arts degree from the University of Maryland College Park before graduating from the University of San Francisco School of Law. She is a member of the District of Columbia Bar and the California State Bar. Before becoming a state legislator, Lee was an attorney in private practice, having previously worked as an attorney for the United States Commission on Civil Rights and the United States Patent and Trademark Office. She was also the co-chairwoman of the Montgomery County NAACP Multicultural Community Partnership.

In the legislature 
On February 19, 2002, Governor Parris Glendening appointed Lee to the Maryland House of Delegates following the election of Nancy Kopp as Treasurer of Maryland. This appointment came after a recommendation by the Montgomery County Democratic Central Committee, on which she sat. She was sworn in on February 21 and was subsequently elected to her first full term in 2002. She was re-elected in 2006 and 2010.

In August 2013, Lee announced that she would run for the Maryland Senate, seeking to succeed state senator Brian Frosh, who ran for Attorney General of Maryland in 2014. She won the Democratic primary with 85.1 percent of the vote, and later won the general election with 70 percent of the vote. Lee was sworn into the Maryland Senate on January 14, 2015. Since November 2018, she has served as the Senate majority whip.

Committee assignments
Maryland House of Delegates
 Member, Judiciary Committee, 2002–2015 (member, gaming law & enforcement subcommittee, 2002–2003; civil law & procedure subcommittee, 2003–2006; chair, juvenile law subcommittee, 2007–2011; chair, family law subcommittee, 2011–2015)
 Deputy Majority Whip, 2003–2015
 Member, Joint Committee on Access to Mental Health Services, 2011–2014

Maryland Senate
 Majority Whip, 2019–2023
 Deputy Majority Whip, 2017–2018
 Member, Judicial Proceedings Committee, 2015–2023
 Joint Committee on Cybersecurity, Information Technology, and Biotechnology, 2015–2023
 Executive Nominations Committee, 2019–2023
 Legislative Policy Committee, 2020–2023

Maryland Secretary of State 
On January 10, 2023, Governor-elect Wes Moore named Lee to serve as the Maryland Secretary of State. She took office in an acting position on January 18, and is the first Asian American person to serve as the Maryland Secretary of State. On February 14, the Maryland Senate unanimously approved Lee's nomination.

Political positions

COVID-19 pandemic
Between late May and June 2020, Lee virtually met four times with representatives from the Maryland Department of Public Safety and Correctional Services, the Maryland Department of Juvenile Services, and the Maryland Judiciary. These meetings resulted in the Senate Judicial Proceedings Committee releasing a report with 19 recommendations to help the state's correctional systems navigate the COVID-19 pandemic.

In March 2021, Lee rebuked disparaging statements made by former president Donald Trump regarding the COVID-19 pandemic, in which phases like "Kung Flu" and the "China virus" stoked racism toward Asian communities. Later that month, after CNN aired a clip showing senior Hogan health advisor and then-Centers for Disease Control and Prevention director Robert R. Redfield saying he believed the COVID-19 virus "escaped" from a lab in China in September or October of 2019, Lee took to the floor of the Maryland Senate to condemn Redfield's comments and suggested that Asian-Americans could be targeted because of his remarks.

Crime and policing
During the 2020 legislative session, Lee introduced a bill that would require prosecutors to disclose whether facial recognition or DNA profiling were used during the criminal investigation of a case. The bill was withdrawn after its first hearing. She also introduced a bill that would make it a crime to possess ransomware with the intent to use it, with sentences up to 10 years in prison and or a $10,000 fine, following a ransomware attack that froze government computers in Baltimore.

During the 2021 legislative session, Lee introduced a bill that would repeal the prohibition on prosecuting sexual crimes against a victim who is the spouse of the assailant. The bill unanimously passed out of the Maryland Senate and passed the Maryland House of Delegates by a vote of 115-18.

Development initiatives
In January 2020, Lee criticized the proposed Capital Beltway and Interstate 270 expansions, telling The Washington Post, "So far the state's top-down kind of planning [on the toll lanes] has disregarded any dialogue about some of the financial risks, the risk to our environment, the risk to our communities, and to our businesses and to our quality of life". She also introduced a bill that would give counties the ability to block state toll projects.

Gun control
During the 2019 legislative session, Lee introduced a bill that would ban ghost guns in Maryland. The bill was reintroduced during the 2022 legislative session, during which it passed the House of Delegates and the state Senate, and became law without Governor Hogan's signature. Following the bill's passage, she was invited to the White House by U.S. President Joe Biden, where he announced a new United States Department of Justice rule regulating ghost guns.

During the 2020 legislative session, Lee introduced a bill that would require background checks for private sales of long guns. The bill passed the Maryland Senate by a vote of 31-14 and the Maryland House of Delegates by a vote of 87-47, but was vetoed by Governor Hogan on May 7, 2020. The Maryland General Assembly voted to override the governor's veto on February 9, 2021.

Immigration
In June 2018, following national outcry about the Trump administration's family separation policy, Lee called on Maryland counties to "stop taking blood money from ICE" to detain immigrants. At the time, only three counties (Frederick, Howard, and Worcester counties) had facilities for detaining immigrants that were used by ICE.

National politics

In April 2015, Lee endorsed U.S. Representative Chris Van Hollen in the 2016 United States Senate election in Maryland. In November, she endorsed former Secretary of State Hillary Clinton for president.

Social issues
In February 2004, Lee criticized a bill that would have defined marriages in Maryland as the union of a man and woman, saying before a House Judiciary Committee hearing, "These bills are inflammatory, they are divisive and they promote intolerance to a large portion of our population". In February 2006, Lee voted against a bill that would amend the Maryland Constitution to ban same-sex marriage in the state. The bill failed to pass by a vote of 61-78. In 2012, she voted for the Civil Marriage Protection Act, which passed out of the Maryland House of Delegates by a vote of 72-67.

During the 2020 legislative session, Lee introduced a bill that would codify the right to abortion access. The bill was withdrawn in the final week of the legislative session, which was shortened by the COVID-19 pandemic.

During the 2021 legislative session, Lee introduced a bill that would have granted adoptees above the age of 18 access to their original birth certificates. The bill failed to pass out of the state Senate by a vote of 16-31. She also introduced a bill that would have required family law judges to undergo a minimum of 60 hours of training on child abuse investigations, implicit bias in custody decisions, parental alienation, and qualifications for child abuse evaluators and treatment providers.

Taxes
In November 2007, Lee voted in favor of House Bill 2, which raised individual and corporate income tax provisions, and House Bill 5, which increased the state sales tax, car titling tax, and hotel tax.

Electoral history

External links

 Susan Lee for Maryland Senate campaign website

References

1954 births
2008 United States presidential electors
21st-century American politicians
21st-century American women politicians
American politicians of Chinese descent
American women of Chinese descent in politics
Asian-American people in Maryland politics
Living people
Democratic Party Maryland state senators
Democratic Party members of the Maryland House of Delegates
People from Bethesda, Maryland
People from Montgomery County, Maryland
People from San Antonio
Secretaries of State of Maryland
University of Maryland, College Park alumni
University of San Francisco alumni
Women state legislators in Maryland